Route 710, consisting of the non-contiguous segments of State Route 710 (SR 710) and Interstate 710 (I-710), is a major north–south state highway and auxiliary Interstate Highway in the Los Angeles metropolitan area of the U.S. state of California. Also called the Los Angeles River Freeway prior to November 18, 1954, the highway was initially planned to connect Long Beach and Pasadena, but a gap in the route exists from Alhambra to Pasadena through South Pasadena due to community opposition to its construction.

The completed southern segment is signed as I-710 and is officially known as the Long Beach Freeway, and it runs north from Long Beach to Valley Boulevard, just north of I-10 (San Bernardino Freeway), near the boundary between the cities of Alhambra and Los Angeles. South of I-5, I-710 follows the course of the Los Angeles River, rarely wandering more than a few hundred feet from the riverbed. South of SR 1 in Long Beach, I-710 is officially part of the Seaside Freeway.

SR 710 is the designation of the completed portion of the proposed northern extension of the route to Pasadena. This segment runs from California Boulevard in Pasadena north to its northern terminus at SR 134 and I-210. It remains unsigned, except for onramps onto the stub which are signed as onramps onto I-210 instead of SR 710. Legislation passed in 2019 authorizes its relinquishment to the City of Pasadena on or after January 1, 2024.

Prior to 1983, the road was not an Interstate, although it was built to Interstate Highway standards. Until 1964 it was State Route 15, but it was renumbered to State Route 7 in the 1964 renumbering because of the existence of I-15, and to I-710 in 1983. However, the northern stub still contains postmile markers designating such stub as both Route 7 and Route 710.

Route description

Section 622 of the California Streets and Highways Code defines Route 710 as "from Route 1 to Route 210 in Pasadena". Section 622.1 amends the definition, stating "Route 710 shall also include that portion of the freeway between Route 1 and the northern end of Harbor Scenic Drive, that portion of Harbor Scenic Drive to Ocean Boulevard, that portion of Ocean Boulevard west of its intersection with Harbor Scenic Drive to its junction with Seaside Boulevard, and that portion of Seaside Boulevard from the junction with Ocean Boulevard to Route 47."

The southern terminus of the freeway presently signed as I-710 is at Ocean Boulevard in Long Beach. From there, the Long Beach Freeway follows the course of the Los Angeles River to Atlantic Boulevard in the city of Bell. I-710 then travels roughly north, east of downtown Los Angeles, to its current northern terminus at Valley Boulevard (just north of I-10) in Alhambra and the El Sereno neighborhood of Los Angeles.

Near its southern terminus, I-710 separates into three spur freeways. The first spur splits at the 9th Street interchange, with the left-branching ramps crossing the Shoemaker Bridge over Los Angeles River and becoming West Shoreline Drive as they head to downtown Long Beach, passing the Aquarium of the Pacific and the Long Beach Convention Center among other attractions. This spur becomes a surface arterial at the intersection with South Chestnut Place and the Pike Parking Garage. The second spur continues south as Harbor Scenic Drive, leading to the eastern piers of the Port of Long Beach and the Queen Mary. Meanwhile, the main segment continues south as the Seaside Freeway, keeping the I-710 designation, until the interchange with Ocean Boulevard, where offramps to Ocean Boulevard west carry both the Seaside Freeway name and I-710 designation across the Long Beach International Gateway Bridge. The I-710 designation then terminates at the interchange with SR 47, while the Seaside Freeway designation continues west along with SR 47 towards the Vincent Thomas Bridge.

There is a part of Route 710 in Pasadena that is constructed to freeway standards, extending from California Boulevard north to the Foothill (I-210)/Ventura (SR 134) freeway interchange. However, the route designation on this freeway stub is unsigned, and is instead marked as if it were merely freeway entrance and exit ramps to and from I-210.

I-710 and SR 710 are part of the California Freeway and Expressway System, and north of SR 1 are part of the National Highway System, a network of highways that are considered essential to the country's economy, defense, and mobility by the Federal Highway Administration.

History

1930–1965
Legislative Route 167 (LR 167) was defined in 1933 to run from San Pedro east to Long Beach and north to Monterey Park. An extension was added in 1947, taking it north to Pasadena. State Route 15 was signed in 1934 along the section of LR 167 from Pacific Coast Highway (SR 3, later U.S. Route 101 Alternate, now SR 1) in Long Beach north to Garvey Avenue (U.S. Route 99 (US 99), replaced by I-10) in Monterey Park. The original pre-freeway alignment ran along Los Robles Avenue (Pasadena) and Atlantic Boulevard. The freeway replacement of SR 15/LR 167 was built from 1953 to 1965. The whole route of LR 167, including the proposed extensions west to San Pedro and north to Pasadena, was renumbered State Route 7 in 1964, after it was decommissioned from portions of the San Diego Freeway (which is now I-405) as part of the state highway renumbering, as the number 15 conflicted with I-15 (Ironically, SR 15 still exists from I-8 to I-5 in San Diego). In 1965, the route was truncated to SR 1 in Long Beach; the part from SR 1 south and west to SR 47 was deleted, and the rest from SR 47 west to SR 11 (now I-110) became part of SR 47.

1964–present
The Long Beach Freeway was approved as a non-chargeable Interstate in September 1983 by the FHWA, and on May 30, 1984, AASHTO approved the SR 7 designations to be renumbered to Interstate 710. In October 1984, the FHWA approved an additional  extension from CA 1 to Ocean Boulevard. The short stub in Pasadena was built in 1975, along with the adjacent sections of I-210 and SR 134. There are still remaining overhead street signs pointing motorists to SR 7 on Ford Boulevard in Monterey Park. These are the last known signs to date.

The existing freeway from SR 1 south to Ocean Boulevard was taken over by the state on August 25, 2000, in a trade with the City of Long Beach for former SR 103 north of SR 1. In 2013, Caltrans adopted the remainder of the Seaside Freeway from Ocean Boulevard to SR 47 over the Gerald Desmond Bridge as part of Route 710. Caltrans and the Port of Long Beach completed the replacement for the old Gerald Desmond Bridge in October 2020; it was named the Long Beach International Gateway Bridge in May 2021.

Future

I-710 corridor project
The significant growth of cargo volumes handled at the ports of Los Angeles and Long Beach has added a large amount of truck traffic to the Long Beach Freeway, since it is the most direct route between the port complex and the railyards in Vernon and East Los Angeles, as well as the Pomona and San Bernardino freeways that connect Los Angeles to railyards in San Bernardino and Colton. The freeway's pavement has been badly damaged as a result since it was not designed to carry nearly as large of a load of truck traffic. It has also become a major source of air pollution, emanating from diesel-fueled trucks idling in rush-hour traffic congestion and giving cities along its route some of the worst air quality in already smoggy Southern California. In response, an Environmental Impact Statement/Environmental Impact Report is currently being conducted to analyze possible significant improvements to I-710 between the Ports of Long Beach and Los Angeles and the Pomona Freeway (SR 60).

In March 2018, Caltrans considered plans to expand I-710, which would have entailed adding lanes for trucks and demolishing homes. However, this would have exacerbated the problem of air pollution around the freeway, by enabling more diesel-power trucks to travel on it. The area around the freeway is already described as a "diesel death zone" due to the pollution. These plans were indefinitely shelved due to public opposition.

Another potential solution to the problem is shifting freight to the Alameda Corridor. This is a freight railroad that runs parallel to I-710. Right now, 33% of freight moving to and from the Port of L.A. goes by rail.

The South Pasadena gap

Overview
The planned segment from Alhambra to Pasadena through South Pasadena has been subject to legal battles which have stopped construction. Because of these legal disputes, the freeway's northern terminus has been Valley Boulevard since the 1960s. However, a short unsigned freeway does exist in Pasadena, heading south from the interchange of I-210 and SR 134 to California Boulevard.

As a result of the route's incomplete condition, freeway signs are inconsistent in their identification of the northbound Long Beach Freeway's destination, with some indicating Pasadena as a control city and others identifying Valley Boulevard as the freeway's terminus. For example, approaching I-710 from SR 60 (Pomona Freeway) in East Los Angeles, westbound traffic is given Valley Boulevard as the destination for northbound I-710, while eastbound traffic is given a destination of Pasadena. Signs at the interchange with I-105 show Pasadena as the destination for northbound I-710.

Currently, traffic headed for Pasadena on I-710 is redirected to I-10 (San Bernardino Freeway) eastbound by signs at the interchange between the two routes in Monterey Park. These signs identify both Pasadena and San Bernardino as control cities for the eastbound San Bernardino Freeway, although it does not actually pass through Pasadena. Traffic from northbound I-710 is routed onto Fremont Avenue in Alhambra and South Pasadena, and the Pasadena Freeway (SR 110).

The areas around I-710, northeastern Los Angeles and the northwestern San Gabriel Valley are subject to traffic congestion. There are no completed north–south freeways in the  area between I-5 (Golden State Freeway) and I-605 (San Gabriel River Freeway). Pro– and anti–I-710 lobbies have debated whether finishing I-710 would alleviate any of the San Gabriel Valley's traffic congestion, or merely displace it from surface streets to the freeway.

2009–2012 corridor studies
Caltrans and its local partner, the Los Angeles County Metropolitan Transportation Authority (Metro), researched the possibility of extending the Long Beach Freeway from Valley Boulevard to Pasadena by building a bored tunnel under Alhambra, El Sereno, and South Pasadena. The premise was that a tunnel would allow Caltrans to extend the freeway without disturbing the residential neighborhoods on the surface, similar to other tunnels throughout the world. The proposed twin  tunnels would have been the longest in the United States, but were small compared with others around the world. Between January and May 2009, Caltrans conducted soil samples for the tunneling project in the Pasadena area and completed a combined environmental impact statement (EIS) and environmental impact report (EIR), in which the tunnel was one option.

In August 2012, Metro narrowed down the list of potential alternatives to study in the EIR/EIS process. The alternatives included: (1) a no-build alternative, where no additional infrastructure would be built to address the gap in the freeway plan between Valley Boulevard and I-210; (2) a roadway tunnel without exits to connect the northern terminus of the freeway at Valley Boulevard to Pasadena; (3) a light rail line connecting East L.A. with Pasadena using a route that travels along the I-710 right of way until Valley Boulevard where it would become a subway until connecting with the Metro Gold Line at the Fillmore Metro station in Pasadena; (4) a bus rapid transit line from Montebello to Pasadena; and (5) Transportation System Management/Transportation Demand Management (TSM/TDM).

Termination
In February 2017, California Assemblyman Chris Holden (D-Pasadena) sponsored a bill to block the completion of the I-710/I-210 gap by tunnel or other means, and his position was supported by South Pasadena and Pasadena. This unanimously led to a decision by the Los Angeles Metro authorities in May to completely defund the completion of the I-710 freeway gap between the northernmost terminus at Valley Blvd in Alhambra, to the I-210 interchange in Pasadena.

The $780 million allocated through Measure R for the intended project of closing of the gap will now be allocated to improvement of certain local surface street projects, improved traffic signal synchronizations, and other "mobility improvement projects". Holden, along with State Senator Anthony Portantino introduced similar legislation, Assembly Bill 29 and Senate Bill 7 respectively, to officially delete this segment of Route 710 from the highway grid. Signed by governor Gavin Newsom in October 2019, they will take effect on January 1, 2024. Among others, the new laws authorize the maintenance of the existing portion of Route 710 between California Boulevard and the I-210/SR 134 interchange to be transferred to the City of Pasadena, and remove that segment from the California Freeway and Expressway System.

Exit list

South Harbor Scenic Drive spur (exit 1A)

Shoreline Drive spur (exit 1C)

References

External links

No 710 Action Committee
Friends of Southern California's Highways
The Life and Death of Great American Freeways: The 710 Case Study by John Dutton
Long Beach Freeway Gap and Stubs
AARoads: Interstate 710
California Highways - Interstate 710

10-7
Interstate 710
Interstate 710
710
10-7
7
Unfinished buildings and structures in the United States
Alhambra, California
El Sereno, Los Angeles
710